This is an inclusive list of opera festivals and summer opera seasons, and music festivals which have opera productions. This list may have some overlap with list of early music festivals. Opera is part of the Western classical music tradition, and has long been performed for audiences on a large-scale format. It started in Italy at the end of the 16th century and soon spread through the rest of Europe. In the 18th century, Italian opera continued to dominate most of Europe (except France), attracting foreign composers such as Handel. Opera seria was the most prestigious form of Italian opera, until Gluck reacted against its artificiality with his "reform" operas in the 1760s. Today the most renowned figure of late 18th century opera is Mozart, and his music is at times the featured attraction of opera and early music festivals.

Related lists and categories
The following lists may have some overlap:
List of music festivals
List of early music festivals

The following categories are related:
:Category:Music festivals
Category:Opera festivals
Category:Choral festivals
Category:Classical music festivals
Category:Chamber music festivals
Category:Contemporary classical music festivals
Category:Early music festivals

Opera festival by name

See also

List of festivals
Country House Opera
List of opera companies

References
Notes

Sources
Operabase's list of opera festivals, by type of festival

Festivals
Festivals
Opera
Opera
Opera